This is a list of rivers in Western Sahara, Morocco. This list is arranged north to south by drainage basin, with respective tributaries indented under each larger stream's name.

Atlantic Ocean
Saquia al Hamra
Oued el Khatt (Uad el Jat)
Oued Tigsert
Oued Lejcheibi
Oued Terguet
Oued Gaddar Talhu
Oued Dirt
Oued Assaq (Uad Assag)
Khatt Atui

References
 GEOnet Names Server 

 
Western Sahara
Rivers